William Arthur Burgess (31 January 1888 at Williton, Somerset – 20 June 1970 at Minehead, Somerset), played seven first-class cricket matches for Somerset in 1921 and 1922.

Biography
Burgess was a right-handed middle order batsman and a left-arm bowler. He passed 50 in an innings only once, making 79 and sharing in a fourth wicket partnership of 128 with Ulick Considine in the match against Worcestershire at Taunton in July 1921.

See also
 William Burgess at www.cricketarchive.com

References

English cricketers
Somerset cricketers
1888 births
1970 deaths
People from West Somerset (district)